Lukianivska is a station on Kyiv Metro's Syretsko-Pecherska Line. The station was opened on 30 December 1996, as part of the first stage extension of the Syretsky radius.

The Syretsky radius was planned in the early 1980s when construction of the whole line began. Open opening of the line in 1989, the tunnel boring to the northwest continued, but in line of economic problems during the early 1990s, construction pace was very slow-paced. Also, the original first stage of the radius was supposed to open with two stations, this and Lvivska Brama. However, due to geological projects with Lvivska Brama, works on the station were stopped in the early 1990s. Lukyanivska was opened in 1996 as the first deep level station following the independence of Ukraine with a new original design (stations opened along the Pechersky radius in 1991-1994 were all from architecture which dates to Soviet-time designs, when they were starting to be built).

In such a case Lukyanivska for the first time, after the turbulent early 1990s, demonstrated an insight into a future. The design, work of architects N. Alyoshkin, V. Gnevyshev and T. Tselikovskaya, incorporates a classic pylon tri-vault design with plastered ceilings and granite floor. Darker black marble is used for lower parts of the pylon, whilst white marble is used for the top and floor. One of the station's most featured details is lighting which consists of a metallic curved pipes with a standard filament light bulb, giving the appearance of a sprouting flower. The large quantity of these elements highlight the bright and cheerful design of the station.

However, when the station was built, due to the low quality of the engineering from the constant breaks in construction due to financial reasons, the hydroisolation of the station was not properly done. As a result, what are meant to be bright white ceilings, are now stained with constant leakages from the soil water. This has a profound impact on the overall appearance of the station.

The station is situated in the middle of the Lukyanivska Square, where the large white-marble faced vestibule structure was built (effectively halving the square in process). The upper level of the vestibule is occupied by a store. The opening of the station, was long-awaited, as it had a considerable impact on the passenger traffic on stations of the Sviatoshynsko-Brovarska Line, although four years later after the opening of the second stage of the radius with the station Dorohozhychi, and Lukyanivska ceasing to be the terminus, there was a notable drop. However most of the passenger traffic that is or was is insignificant to what it will be after the opening of the Hlubochitska station of the Podilsko-Voskresenska Line in 2015, and Lukianivska becoming a transfer station. The connection will likely include a link to the far end of the central hall, which is now occupied by a white marble wall.

During the 2022 Russia-Ukraine war, the station and other stations on the Kyiv Metro were badly damaged.

References

External links

  Kyivsky Metropoliten - Station description and Photographs
  Metropoliten.kiev.ua - Station description and Photographs
  Zarohem.cz- Photographs

Kyiv Metro stations
Railway stations opened in 1996
1996 establishments in Ukraine